Pectinivalva is a genus of moths of the family Nepticulidae.

Species
Subgenus Pectinivalva
Pectinivalva caenodora (Meyrick, 1906)
Pectinivalva chalcitis (Meyrick, 1906)
Pectinivalva commoni Scoble, 1983
Pectinivalva endocapna (Meyrick, 1906)
Pectinivalva gilva (Meyrick, 1906)
Pectinivalva melanotis (Meyrick, 1906)
Pectinivalva mystaconota Hoare, 2013
Subgenus Casanovula Hoare, 2013
Pectinivalva brevipalpa Hoare, 2013
Pectinivalva minotaurus Hoare, 2013
Subgenus Menurella Hoare, 2013
Pectinivalva acmenae Hoare, 2013
Pectinivalva anazona (Meyrick, 1906)
Pectinivalva funeralis (Meyrick, 1906)
Pectinivalva libera (Meyrick, 1906)
Pectinivalva planetis (Meyrick, 1906)
Pectinivalva primigena (Meyrick, 1906)
Pectinivalva quintiniae Hoare & Van Nieukerken, 2013
Pectinivalva scotodes Hoare, 2013
Pectinivalva trepida (Meyrick, 1906)
Pectinivalva tribulatrix Van Nieukerken & Hoare, 2013
Pectinivalva warburtonensis (Wilson, 1939) 
Pectinivalva xenadelpha Van Nieukerken & Hoare, 2013

External links
Australian Faunal Directory
Phylogeny and host-plant relationships of the Australian Myrtaceae leafmining moth genus Pectinivalva (Lepidoptera, Nepticulidae), with new subgenera and species

Nepticulidae
Monotrysia genera